Urs Leimgruber (1 January 1952 in Lucerne) is a Swiss saxophonist. He lived in Paris from 1988 to 2005. Then he came back to his home town, Lucerne. His fields of activity are improvisation, Jazz and 20th-century classical music.

Discography

With Steve Lacy
Itinerary (hat ART, 1991)

References

Swiss saxophonists
Male saxophonists
Swiss jazz musicians
1952 births
Living people
21st-century saxophonists
21st-century male musicians
Male jazz musicians